The Delahaye VLR was a four-wheel-drive passenger vehicle clearly inspired by the Jeep and first presented, after an unusually long gestation, by Delahaye during the Summer of 1950.   At a time when the luxury car market had been driven into freefall by a combination of government taxation policy and the depressed state of the postwar economy, the VLR was critical in keeping alive the company that produced it during the early 1950s.

“VLR” stood for « Véhicule léger de reconnaissance » (light reconnaissance vehicle).   The name « VLRD » Véhicule léger de reconnaissance Delahaye» is also sometimes used.

The vehicle featured a light metal ohc four-cylinder water-cooled engine of (initially) 1,995 cc and, by the standards of the time, a sophisticated suspension system.   The four-speed gear box featured synchromesh on all four speeds.

During the second half of 1950 the French army tested it extensively and declared themselves impressed.   With only very minor modifications, they homologated the VLR for army use and placed an order for slightly more than 4,000.   The company's postwar production model, the Delahaye 175 had fared disastrously in the marketplace, with just 521 produced between 1947 and 1950, so the military order secured for the VLR was more than welcome.

The army were impressed by the performance of the vehicle both on and off-road, and the company was encouraged to try to sell VLRs into the civilian market.   Civilian-market models were hard to distinguish from the military ones, but the 24-volt electrical system upon which  the military had insisted was replaced, in the civilian VLRs, by a more conventional (for the time and vehicle's size) 12-volt electrical system.   The VLR's civil-market price of above one and a half million francs was considered expensive (though much lower than the prices asked for the company's luxury passenger cars), and its mechanical complexity made it an unattractive proposition other than for rich owner-mechanics.   It is worth bearing in mind that in the aftermath of a massive European war there were at this time a large number of second-hand Jeeps competing for the attention of anyone thinking to buy a civilian version of a VRC. Almost all of the 9,621 VLRs sold between 1951 and 1955 were accordingly sold to the military.   Production was halted in March 1954, but vehicles were still being delivered in 1955.

It was said that the mechanical complexity of the vehicle, which excited much comment in the press and was blamed for its lack of sales success on the civilian market, was not seen as a problem by the army.   Nevertheless, by the mid-1950s the army had switched to the mechanically simpler Jeep, then being assembled in France by Hotchkiss under Willys license as the Hotchkiss M201. The Delahaye business itself was taken over by Hotchkiss in 1954, after which VLR production seems to have been quickly stopped.

Technical data

References 

Delahaye vehicles
All-wheel-drive vehicles
Off-road vehicles
Military light utility vehicles
Military vehicles of France
Cars introduced in 1951